Jeffrey Michael Tambor (born July 8, 1944) is an American actor. He is known for his television roles such as Jeffrey Brookes, the uptight neighbor of Stanley and Helen Roper in the television sitcom The Ropers (1979–1980), as Hank Kingsley on The Larry Sanders Show (1992–1998), George Bluth Sr. and Oscar Bluth on Arrested Development (2003–2006, 2013, 2018–2019) and Maura Pfefferman on Transparent (2014–2017). For his role in the latter, Tambor earned two Primetime Emmy Awards for Outstanding Lead Actor in a Comedy Series out of three nominations. In 2015, he was also awarded a Golden Globe for his portrayal of Pfefferman.

His film roles include Jay Porter in ...And Justice for All (1979), Jinx Latham in Mr. Mom (1983), Sully in There's Something About Mary (1998), Mayor Augustus Maywho in How the Grinch Stole Christmas (2000), Tom Manning in Hellboy (2004) and its sequel Hellboy II: The Golden Army (2008), Sid Garner in The Hangover trilogy (2009–2013), Francis Silverberg in The Accountant (2016), and Georgy Malenkov in The Death of Stalin (2017). 

Tambor has done voice acting for The SpongeBob SquarePants Movie (2004), Monsters vs. Aliens (2009), Tangled (2010), and Trolls (2016). For his voice role in The Lionhearts (1998), he was nominated for a Daytime Emmy Award. From 2002 to 2003, he was an announcer for Hollywood Squares.

Early life
Tambor was born on July 8, 1944, in San Francisco, California, the son of Eileen (born Salzberg), a homemaker, and Bernard Tambor, a flooring contractor. He grew up in a Conservative Jewish family with roots in Hungary and Ukraine. Tambor is a graduate of Abraham Lincoln High School and San Francisco State University, where he studied acting and then went on to receive a master's degree from Wayne State University.

Career

Early career
Tambor first moved to repertory theater in Milwaukee, later making his Broadway debut in the comedy Sly Fox (1976), appearing with George C. Scott and directed by Arthur Penn. He appeared in Measure for Measure in the same year. In 1979, he starred in Norman Jewison's ...And Justice For All, as a lawyer friend of the protagonist, Arthur Kirkland (Al Pacino). In an early TV job, an ad for Avis rent-a-car, he was seen running (huffing and puffing) through an airport, mocking O. J. Simpson's "Go, O.J., go!" ads for Hertz. He has had a significant career in episodic TV, where he made numerous guest appearances on different shows, including Taxi, Kojak, M*A*S*H, The Golden Girls, and Three's Company. In 1979, Tambor got his first role as a main character in television in the short-lived show The Ropers. Throughout the 1980s Tambor had a recurring role on Hill Street Blues playing a defense attorney who eventually becomes a judge. In 1981, he appeared in an episode of Barney Miller as a man who was trying to bring exposure to the members of the Trilateral Commission in charge of the coming New World Order. In 1987, and 1988, Tambor appeared as a regular on the prime time ABC series Max Headroom as Murray, Edison's editor. In 1990, he appeared in the music video for the Phil Collins song "I Wish It Would Rain Down".

The Larry Sanders Show
Tambor played Hank Kingsley, the narcissistic sidekick of fictional talk show host Larry Sanders on The Larry Sanders Show. Tambor received four Emmy nominations for his performance on the show—all of which he would lose, to Michael Richards for Seinfeld, David Hyde Pierce for Frasier, and his co-star Rip Torn. The character's famous catch phrase was "Hey, now!".

Arrested Development
Beginning in 2003, Tambor starred in the television comedy Arrested Development as George Bluth Sr. and in some episodes as his twin brother Oscar Bluth. The show was cancelled in 2006, after three seasons, but a fourth season was released on Netflix in 2013.

In 2004, Tambor received his fifth Emmy nomination for his work on the show. He lost to David Hyde Pierce for the final season of the sitcom Frasier. Tambor was nominated for a sixth time in 2005 but lost to Brad Garrett for the final season of Everybody Loves Raymond. The second episode of Arrested Development's third season lampooned this loss: Tambor's character's son describes his acting ability by saying, "It's a wonderful performance, Dad. You're a regular Brad Garrett."

Later work
Tambor served as the announcer (and occasional square) for the game show Hollywood Squares in 2002 and 2003. He was the voice of King Neptune in 2004's The SpongeBob SquarePants Movie. In the spring of 2005, he starred as George Aaronow in the Broadway revival of Glengarry Glen Ross.

After the cancellation of Arrested Development in April 2006, Tambor signed on to a series with John Lithgow called Twenty Good Years about two men who ponder the last 20 years of their life. The show premiered on NBC on October 11, 2006, but was taken off the air after only a few episodes. Also in 2006, he portrayed George Washington on The Radio Adventures of Dr. Floyd. He starred as "Uncle" Saul in the CBS comedy Welcome to The Captain until its cancellation in March 2008. He has made several cameo appearances on Entourage as a fictionalized version of himself who regularly annoys his agent, Ari Gold.

For several years, based on his availability, Tambor has taught a class for actors. He was a longtime teaching associate of acting coach Milton Katselas.

In 2009, Tambor appeared in the animated film Monsters vs. Aliens and in the comedy The Hangover. In 2009, Tambor began playing the recurring character Len Trexler in the sardonic comedy Archer, an animated television series on the FX network. He is a major love interest to Malory Archer played by Jessica Walter – the two formerly playing husband and wife in Arrested Development.

Tambor replaced Kelsey Grammer as Georges in the Broadway revival of the musical La Cage aux Folles on February 15, 2011, but withdrew from the production after the February 24 performance. Also in 2011, Tambor starred in an indie comedy, Lucky. That same year, he had a minor role in the film Paul with Simon Pegg and Nick Frost, reprised his Hangover role for its sequel, and was featured in Flypaper, with Patrick Dempsey and Ashley Judd.

In 2012, Tambor co-starred as Walt, Pete's aspiring musician father on the sitcom Bent starring Amanda Peet and David Walton. In May 2013 he returned to Arrested Development for season 4 and subsequently, season 5 in 2018–2019.

In 2017 he played Georgy Malenkov in The Death of Stalin.

In May 2017, Tambor released a book entitled Are You Anybody? A Memoir.

Transparent

In February 2014, Amazon premiered its original series Transparent, which starred Tambor as Maura Pfefferman (born Morton Pfefferman), a divorced transgender Jewish parent of three. Tambor won the Golden Globe Award for Best Actor in a Television Series – Musical or Comedy for his portrayal and thanked the transgender community in his speech. He won the Primetime Emmy Award for Outstanding Lead Actor in a Comedy Series for his performance in season 1 of the show, his first win in 7 Primetime Emmy Award nominations. This made him the first actor to win an Emmy for portraying a transgender character.

For the show's second season, Tambor again received positive reviews, as well as a nomination for the Golden Globe Award for Best Actor – Television Series Musical or Comedy, and wins for the Screen Actors Guild Award for Outstanding Performance by a Male Actor in a Comedy Series and the Critics' Choice Television Award for Best Actor in a Comedy Series.

Following allegations of sexual harassment, Tambor said he would not return for the show's fifth season, which was later confirmed on February 15, 2018, when Amazon confirmed to Deadline that Tambor was not coming back and that the harassment investigation was recently concluded.

Sexual misconduct allegations
On November 8, 2017, Tambor was accused of sexual misconduct by his former assistant, Van Barnes. On November 16, 2017, actress Trace Lysette additionally made accusations against Tambor. Tambor responded, "I am deeply sorry if any action of mine was ever misinterpreted by anyone as being sexually aggressive or if I ever offended or hurt anyone. But the fact is, for all my flaws, I am not a predator and the idea that someone might see me in that way is more distressing than I can express." Days later, makeup artist Tamara Delbridge also accused Tambor of sexual improprieties on the set of the 2001 film Never Again. Tambor said he did not recall the incident, but apologized "for any discomfort or offense I may have inadvertently caused her."

By this time, Tambor had left Transparent, saying in a statement on November 19, "Playing Maura Pfefferman on Transparent has been one of the greatest privileges and creative experiences of my life. What has become clear over the past weeks, however, is that this is no longer the job I signed up for four years ago. I've already made clear my deep regret if any action of mine was ever misinterpreted by anyone as being aggressive, but the idea that I would deliberately harass anyone is simply and utterly untrue. Given the politicized atmosphere that seems to have afflicted our set, I don't see how I can return to Transparent." The allegations came after filming for the fifth season of Arrested Development had completed that same month. The show's team supported Tambor in his defense against the allegations and his scenes remained within the show.

In his first interview after leaving Transparent, Tambor, speaking to The Hollywood Reporter in May 2018, continued to deny allegations that he had sexually harassed his former assistant or Trace Lysette on the series, but admitted to having anger issues throughout his life. He also said that while he was on the show he "worried [himself] to death" about whether he was portraying his transgender character truthfully, and that the stress sometimes made him "difficult" and "mean". Tambor mentioned one "blowup" he had with Arrested Development co-star Jessica Walter during the show's production. On May 23, 2018, Walter said in a New York Times cast interview that Tambor had verbally harassed her. "He never crossed the line on our show with any, you know, sexual whatever. Verbally, yes, he harassed me, but he did apologize ... In like almost 60 years of working, I've never had anybody yell at me like that on a set." When asked whether she had reservations about working with Tambor again, Walter said, "Of course not." "I don't want to walk around with anger," she added. "I respect him as an actor. We've known each other for years and years and years. Of course, I would work with him again in a heartbeat."

Personal life
Tambor and his wife Kasia have a son Gabriel Kasper, younger daughter Eve Julia, and twin sons Hugo Bernard and Eli Nicholas, born on October 4, 2009. He has an adult daughter from an earlier relationship.

In 2007, Tambor was reported to be a Scientologist. However, in February 2008, he expressed concern about "Internet reports" about his alleged involvement with Scientology and stated that he "took some Scientology classes at one time, studied Scientology for a while, but no more. I have nothing against it, but I am no longer a Scientologist."

Filmography

Film

Television

Video games

References

External links

 
 
 
 
A curious SF kid grows up to be Jeffrey Tambor, Maura Pfefferman

1944 births
Living people
20th-century American male actors
21st-century American male actors
Activists from California
American male film actors
American male television actors
American male voice actors
American people of Hungarian-Jewish descent
American people of Russian-Jewish descent
Best Musical or Comedy Actor Golden Globe (television) winners
California Democrats
Game show announcers
Jewish American male actors
American former Scientologists
Male actors from San Francisco
Outstanding Performance by a Lead Actor in a Comedy Series Primetime Emmy Award winners
Outstanding Performance by a Male Actor in a Comedy Series Screen Actors Guild Award winners
People from Topanga, California
San Francisco State University alumni
Wayne State University alumni